is a Japanese manga artist.

Career 
She debuted in 1992 in Kodansha's Nakayoshi magazine with Taiyō no Romance. Her works later moved to Bessatsu Friend magazine, also published by Kodansha. Her career was put on hiatus in October 2005, after she was discovered to have plagiarized other artists, including tracing others' work. She later resumed her work in March 2007.

On March 24, 2009, her work Chihayafuru was chosen for the Manga Taishō.

Political views 
On June 5, 2020, she expressed support for Black Lives Matter movement.

She supported Kenji Utsunomiya for the 2020 Tokyo gubernatorial election.

Selected works
 , 1995, serialized in Bessatsu Friend
 , 1996, serialized in Bessatsu Friend
 Promise, 1996, serialized in Bessatsu Friend
 Only You - Tobenai Tsubasa (Only You-翔べない翼-), 1997-2000, serialized in Bessatsu Friend, published in 8 volumes
 , 1998
 , 1998-1999, serialized in Bessatsu Friend Juliet DX
 , 2000-2004, serialized in Bessatsu Friend, published in 12 volumes (Completed, but later removed from stores and taken out of print because of plagiarism)
 Silver, 2004-2005, serialized in Bessatsu Friend, published in 2 volumes (Canceled when earlier plagiarism came to light)
 , published in 2 volumes
 
 
 , 2007-2022, serialized in Be Love, published in 50 volumes
 , since 2009, serialized in Be Love, published in 2 volumes

External links

 (Japanese)

References 

1975 births
Female comics writers
Japanese female comics artists
Japanese women writers
Living people
Manga artists from Fukuoka Prefecture
Manga Taishō
People involved in plagiarism controversies
Women manga artists